Antoni Łukasiewicz (born 26 June 1983) is a Polish former footballer who played as a defender.

Career

Club
In August 2007, he was loaned to U.D. Leiria.

In August 2011, he was loaned to ŁKS Łódź on a half-year deal and turned his loan into a permanent deal on 23 February 2012.

International
Łukasiewicz debuted for Poland in December 2008 against Serbia. He is a former captain of Poland's U-21 national team.

Honours

Club
Arka Gdynia
 Polish Cup: 2016–17

References

External links
 
 
 

Polish footballers
Polish expatriate footballers
Poland international footballers
Polonia Warsaw players
Śląsk Wrocław players
ŁKS Łódź players
Elche CF players
U.D. Leiria players
Górnik Zabrze players
Arka Gdynia players
Primeira Liga players
Ekstraklasa players
Expatriate footballers in Spain
Expatriate footballers in Portugal
Polish expatriate sportspeople in Portugal
Living people
1983 births
Footballers from Warsaw
Association football defenders